New York City Ballet (NYCB) is a ballet company founded in 1948 by choreographer George Balanchine and Lincoln Kirstein.  Balanchine and Jerome Robbins are considered the founding choreographers of the company. Léon Barzin was the company's first music director.  City Ballet grew out of earlier troupes: the Producing Company of the School of American Ballet, 1934; the American Ballet, 1935, and Ballet Caravan, 1936, which merged into American Ballet Caravan, 1941; and directly from the Ballet Society, 1946.

History 

In a 1946 letter, Kirstein stated, "The only justification I have is to enable Balanchine to do exactly what he wants to do in the way he wants to do it." He served as the company's General Director from 1946 to 1989, developing and sustaining it by his organizational and fundraising abilities.

The company was named New York City Ballet in 1948 when it became resident at City Center of Music and Drama. Its success was marked by its move to the New York State Theater, now David H. Koch Theater, designed by Philip Johnson to Balanchine's specifications. City Ballet became the first ballet company in the United States to have two permanent venue engagements: one at Lincoln Center's David H. Koch Theater on 63rd Street in Manhattan, and another at the Saratoga Performing Arts Center, in Saratoga Springs, New York. The School of American Ballet (S.A.B.), which Balanchine founded, is the training school of the company.

After the company's move to the State Theater, Balanchine's creativity as a choreographer flourished. He created works that were the basis of the company's repertory until his death in 1983.  He worked closely with choreographer Jerome Robbins, who resumed his connection with the company in 1969 after having produced works for Broadway.

NYCB still has the largest repertoire by far of any American ballet company. It often stages 60 ballets or more in its winter and spring seasons at Lincoln Center each year, and 20 or more in its summer season in Saratoga Springs. City Ballet has performed The Nutcracker, Romeo and Juliet, A Midsummer Night's Dream, and many more. City Ballet has trained and developed many great dancers since its formation. Many dancers with already developed reputations have also joined the ballet as principal dancers:

 Merrill Ashley
 Mikhail Baryshnikov
 Ashley Bouder
 Jacques d'Amboise
 Suzanne Farrell
 Melissa Hayden
 Sterling Hyltin
 Jillana
 Allegra Kent
 Gelsey Kirkland
 Tanaquil LeClercq
 Nicholas Magallanes
 Peter Martins
 Nilas Martins
 Patricia McBride
 Sara Mearns
 Monique Meunier
 Arthur Mitchell
 Francisco Moncion
 Kyra Nichols
 Tiler Peck
 Teresa Reichlen
 Jock Soto
 Maria Tallchief
 Edward Villella

Salute to Italy   

In 1960, Balanchine mounted City Ballet's Salute to Italy with premieres of Monumentum pro Gesualdo and Variations from Don Sebastian (called the Donizetti Variations since 1961), as well as performances of his La Sonnambula and Lew Christensen's Con Amore. The performance was repeated in 1968.

Stravinsky Festival   

In 1972, Balanchine offered an eight-day tribute to the composer, his great collaborator, who had died the year before. His programs included twenty-two new works of his own dances, plus works by choreographers Todd Bolender, John Clifford, Lorca Massine, Jerome Robbins, Richard Tanner, and John Taras, as well as repertory ballets by Balanchine and Robbins. Balanchine created Symphony in Three Movements, Duo Concertant, and Violin Concerto for the occasion. He and Robbins co-choreographed and performed in Pulcinella. Balanchine had produced an earlier Stravinsky festival in 1937 as balletmaster of the American Ballet while engaged by the Metropolitan Opera. The composer conducted the April 27th premiere of Card Party.

Ravel Festival   
In 1975, Balanchine paid his respects to the French composer Maurice Ravel with a two-week Hommage à Ravel. Balanchine, Robbins, Jacques d'Amboise, and Taras made sixteen new ballets for the occasion. Repertory ballets were performed as well. High points included Balanchine's Le Tombeau de Couperin and Robbins' Mother Goose.

Tschaikovsky Festival   
In 1981, Balanchine planned a two-week NYCB festival honoring the Russian composer Peter Ilyitch Tschaikovsky. Balanchine, Joseph Duell, d'Amboise, Peter Martins, Robbins, and Taras created twelve new dances. In addition to presenting these and repertory ballets, Balanchine re-choreographed his Mozartiana from 1933. Philip Johnson and John Burgee's stage setting of translucent tubing was designed to be hung and lit in different architectural configurations throughout the entire festival.

Stravinsky Centennial Celebration 

In 1982, Balanchine organized a centennial celebration in honor of his long-time collaborator Igor Stravinsky, during which the City Ballet performed twenty-five ballets set to the composer's music. Balanchine made three new ballets, Tango, Élégie, and Persephone, and a new version of Variations. The choreographer died the following year. Balanchine's 50th Anniversary Celebration was held by the company in 2002.

New York State Theater 20-Year Celebration 
On April 26, 1984, NYCB celebrated the 20th anniversary of the New York State Theater. The program started with Igor Stravinsky's Fanfare for a New Theater, followed by Stravinsky's arrangement of The Star-Spangled Banner. The ballets included three of Balanchine's works, Serenade, Stravinsky Violin Concerto, and Sonatine; and Jerome Robbins' Afternoon of a Faun. The performers included Maria Calegari, Kyra Nichols, Heather Watts, Leonid Kozlov, Afshin Mofid, Patricia McBride, Helgi Tomasson, Karin von Aroldingen, Lourdes Lopez, Bart Cook, and Joseph Duell.

Peter Martins
After Balanchine's death in 1983, Peter Martins was selected as balletmaster of the company.  After 30 years, Martins was judged to have maintained the New York City Ballet's financial security and the musicality and performance level of the dancers, but he has not emphasized the Balanchine style to the extent that many observers expected he would. Martins retired from his position in 2018.

American Music Festival 

 
For the company's 40th anniversary, Martins held an American Music Festival, having commissioned dances from choreographers Laura Dean, Eliot Feld, William Forsythe, Lar Lubovitch, Paul Taylor. He also presented ballets by George Balanchine and Robbins. The programs included world premieres of more than twenty dances. Martins contributed Barber Violin Concerto, Black and White, The Chairman Dances, A Fool for You, Fred and George, Sophisticated Lady, Tanzspiel, Tea-Rose, and The Waltz Project.

Jerome Robbins celebration 
A major component of the Spring 2008 season was a celebration of Jerome Robbins; major revivals were mounted of the following ballets:

 2 and 3 Part Inventions
 Afternoon of a Faun
 Andantino
 Antique Epigraphs
 Brahms/Handel
 Brandenburg
 The Cage
 The Concert
 Dances at a Gathering
 Dybbuk
 Fancy Free
 Fanfare
 Four Bagatelles
 The Four Seasons
 Glass Pieces
 The Goldberg Variations
 I'm Old Fashioned
 In G Major
 In Memory of ...
 In the Night
 Interplay
 Ives, Songs
 NY Export: Opus Jazz
 Les Noces
 Opus 19/The Dreamer
 Other Dances
 Piano Pieces
 A Suite of Dances
 Watermill
 West Side Story Suite

Dancers' Choice   
Friday, June 27, 2008, the first Dancers' Choice benefit was held for the Dancers' Emergency Fund. The program was initiated by Peter Martins, conceived and supervised by principal dancer Jonathan Stafford, assisted by Kyle Froman, Craig Hall, Amanda Hankes, Adam Hendrickson, Ask la Cour, Henry Seth, and Daniel Ulbricht, and consisted of:

 
 Beethoven Romance
 Flit of Fury/The Monarch
 

and excerpts from:

 Ecstatic Orange
 Jewels
 Emeralds
 Rubies
 Square Dance
 Interplay
 Dances at a Gathering
 Glass Pieces
 Union Jack
 Stars and Stripes
 Mercurial Manoeuvres
 Symphony in C

On June 14, 2009, the second Dancers' Choice benefit was held at a special evening performance. The program included Sleeping Beauty and Union Jack. The program was supervised by principal dancer Jenifer Ringer.

Programming 

NYCB performs fall, winter and spring repertory seasons at the David H. Koch Theater at Lincoln Center as well as George Balanchine's Nutcracker during November and December; they have a summer residency at the Saratoga Performing Arts Center and regularly tour internationally.

Introductory talks about a current performance, called First Position Discussions, are held before some performances or during some intervals in the fourth ring, house right; the docents are volunteers and include laymen as well as former dancers. Hour-long Inside NYCB events explore the history and inner workings of the company through performance and discussion, often with dancers and artistic staff.

Other public programs include Family Saturdays, one-hour interactive programs for children 5 and up; Children's Workshops and In Motion Workshops, pre-performance explorations of the music, movement, and themes of a ballet featured in the matinee performance for children ages 5–8 and 9–11, respectively; and Ballet Essentials, a 75-minute informal ballet class for adults ages 21 and up with little to no prior dance experience. These programs are all facilitated by NYCB dancers.

$30 for 30 and Fourth Ring Society/Society NYCB  

New York City Ballet offers tickets for $30 to select performances for patrons ages 13 to 30 at the box office, or online or by phone with an account; sales for each performance week (Tue. evening through Sun. matinee) begin at 10:00 a.m. on the Monday of that week.

New York City Ballet's Fourth Ring Society offered discounted tickets to all shows in the theater's Fourth Ring for a small annual fee. This program was closed to new members in 2011 and renamed Society NYCB to reflect an expanded offering of discounted seats in all sections of the theater, although over time a few ballet programs (e.g., Nutcracker) and individual dates became unavailable.

New York Choreographic Institute 

City Ballet's Choreographic Institute was founded by Irene Diamond and Peter Martins in 2000. It has three main programmatic programs: choreographic sessions, providing choreographers with dancers and studio space; fellowship initiatives, annual awards in support of an emerging choreographer affiliated with a ballet company; and choreographic forums, symposia and round-table discussions on choreography, music, and design elements.

Dancers

Principal Dancers

Artistic staff 

The following is the current artistic staff (except dancers, who are listed at List of New York City Ballet dancers):

Senior repertory director
 Rosemary Dunleavy

Repertory directors

Guest teachers 

 Espen Giljane
 Arch Higgins
 Darci Kistler
 Andrei Kramarevsky

Children's repertory director 
 Dena Abergel

Associate children's repertory director 
 Arch Higgins

Resident choreographer and artistic advisor 
 Justin Peck

The New York City Ballet Orchestra 
The 66-member NYCB Orchestra is an important symphonic institution in its own right, having played for virtually all of the thousands of performances NYCB has given over the decades.  It is one of the most versatile orchestras in the world, on any given week performing perhaps three or four times the repertoire that another symphony might be expected to do.  Principal players of the orchestra also perform the majority of the concertos, other solos, and chamber music in the NYCB repertory as well. The orchestra accompanies the ballet on all of its North American tours, and while the ballet uses local orchestras on its international tours, members of the NYCB Orchestra often go along as soloists or extras.

Besides the members of the orchestra, the NYCB has six pianists on full-time staff. They all perform in the pit with the orchestra on a regular basis.

The NYCB Orchestra also occasionally accompanies dance companies from other cities at the Koch Theater. These have included the Australian Ballet in the Spring 2012, and the San Francisco Ballet in the Fall 2013.

In January 2019, it was announced that an anonymous donor had funded the renaming of the orchestra pit as the "Stravinsky Orchestra Pit" .

Music director 
Andrew Litton was appointed to the position on December 16, 2014, and started in September 2015.

Staff conductors 
 Clotilde Otranto
 Andrews Sill (acting Music Director 2012–2014 and Associate Music Director 2014–present) 
 Daniel Capps 
 Ryan McAdams (associate conductor 2011)

Historical music directors 
 Leon Barzin, 1948–c1963
 Robert Irving ("The Duke"), c.1963–1989
 Gordon Boelzner, 1989–2000
 Andrea Quinn, 2000–2006
 Fayçal Karoui, 2006–2012

Other conductors of note 
 Hugo Fiorato (retired 2004) (Conductor Emeritus),
 Maurice Kaplow (retired 2010 as Principal Conductor)

Controversies

Misconduct allegations against Peter Martins
In December 2017, Martins took a leave of absence from the New York City Ballet following an allegation of sexual misconduct made against him. Five City Ballet dancers later told the New York Times that Martins had verbally or physical abused them; Martins denied engaging in any misconduct. Martins retired from the City Ballet on January 1, 2018. An independent inquiry commissioned by NYCB and SAB and led by employment-law attorney Barbara E. Hoey did not corroborate the allegations of harassment or violence made against Martins, according to a joint statement issued by the company and school. The report itself was not made public.

Nude photos allegation
In September 2018, Alexandra Waterbury, an ex-girlfriend of NYCB principal dancer Chase Finlay, began a civil action in New York County Supreme Court against Finlay, principal dancers Amar Ramasar and Zachary Catazaro, NYCB patron Jared Longhitano, New York City Ballet and SAB. Her lawsuit claimed harm by Finlay for allegedly taking and sharing sexually explicit photos and videos of Waterbury without her knowledge or consent, and by Ramasar, Catazaro, Longhitano, NYCB and SAB for allegedly contributing to that harm in various ways.

All defendants disputed key factual allegations made in the complaint as well as their liability as a matter of law; they all filed motions to dismiss. The case is currently pending disposition.

Waterbury's lawsuit led to Finlay's resignation and the firing of Ramasar and Catazaro. In April 2019 an arbitrator ordered Ramasar and Catazaro reinstated; Catazaro decided not to rejoin the company.

See also 

In the Wings: Behind the Scenes at the New York City Ballet, 2007 book
List of productions of Swan Lake derived from its 1895 revival

References

Bibliography 
Balanchine. A Biography, Bernard Taper. Collier Books Edition.
The New York City Ballet. Thirty Years, Lincoln Kirstein.
The New York City Ballet, Anatole Chujoy. Knopf. 1953.

External links 

 
  – School of American Ballet
 
 New York City Ballet records, 1934–1976 – Jerome Robbins Dance Division, New York Public Library for the Performing Arts
 New York City Ballet scores, 1930–1965 – Music Division, New York Public Library for the Performing Arts
 Merrill Ashley papers, 1950–2017 Jerome Robbins Dance Division, New York Public Library for the Performing Arts
 Costas dance photographs, 1966–2016 – Jerome Robbins Dance Division,  New York Public Library for the Performing Arts
 https://archive.org/details/dancenewyorkcityballet USA Dance: New York City Ballet (1965)] – Educational film featuring George Balanchine and performances by dancers of the New York City Ballet including Arthur Mitchell, Suzanne Farrell, Patricia McBride, Edward Villella, Jacques D'Amboise and Melisa Hayden on archive.org
 Archive footage of Merrill Ashley and John Meehan performing the pas de deux from Agon in 1987 at Jacob's Pillow

 
1948 establishments in New York City
Performing groups established in 1948
Dance in New York City
Lincoln Center
History of ballet
Dance companies in New York City